Goals against average (GAA) also known as "average goals against" or "AGA" is a statistic used in field hockey, ice hockey, lacrosse, soccer, and water polo that is the mean of goals allowed per game by a goaltender or goalkeeper (depending on sport). GAA is analogous to a baseball pitcher's earned run average (ERA). In Japanese, the same translation (防御率) is used for both GAA and ERA, because of this.

For ice hockey, the goals against average statistic is the number of goals a goaltender allows per 60 minutes of playing time. It is calculated by taking the number of goals against, multiply that by 60 (minutes) and then dividing by the number of minutes played. The modification is used by the NHL since 1965 and the IIHF since 1990. When calculating GAA, overtime goals and time on ice are included, whereas empty net and shootout goals are not. It is typically given to two decimal places.

The top goaltenders in the National Hockey League have a GAA of about 1.85-2.10, although the measure of a good GAA changes as different playing styles come and go. The top goaltenders in the National Lacrosse League however, have a GAA of about 10.00, and the top 2005 Western Lacrosse Association goaltenders had a GAA of about 9.00. At their best, elite NCAA water polo goalies have a GAA between 3.00 and 5.00.

Since the statistic is highly dependent on the team playing in front of a goalie, save percentage is usually considered a more accurate measure of a goaltender's skill, especially in ice hockey and lacrosse, as it takes into account the number of shots the goaltender has faced. In soccer, since it is considered a part of the goalkeeper's job to coach defenders on proper positioning to prevent opponents' shots, GAA is more commonly used to evaluate goalkeepers than save percentage.

References

Ice hockey statistics